Arbore is an Afro-Asiatic language spoken by the Arbore people in southern Ethiopia in a few settlements of Hamer woreda near Lake Chew Bahir.

That the Arbore language belongs within a "Macro-Somali" (now called Omo-Tana) group was first recognized by Sasse (1974). Other members of this group are Daasanach, Bayso, Rendille, Boni and the various Somali dialects. Omo-Tana itself is a major division of Lowland East Cushitic. Arbore's nearest relatives (jointly classified as Western Omo-Tana) are Daasanach and especially the probably extinct Kenyan language of the Elmolo fishermen of Lake Turkana. The sub-grouping is justified in terms of uniquely shared lexicon and certain common grammatical innovations, amongst which the generalizations of the absolute forms of the 1st person singular and 2nd person singular personal pronouns to subject function, thereby replacing the earlier Proto-Lowland East Cushitic forms, e.g. 2nd personal pronouns, e.g., 2nd person singular tai/u 'thou': ki/u 'thee', but Arbore ke 'thou' and 'thee'.

Phonology
The phonology of Arbore was described by Hayward (1984). He lists the following phonemes:

Consonants

All consonant phonemes except /h, ʃ, ŋ, p, ʔ/ can be geminated.

Vowels

Morphosyntax
Arbore well exemplifies a number of typical Lowland East Cushitic features such as: a three-term number system (basic unit: singulative: plural) in nouns, within which "polarity" figures, i.e., gender alternations across the various number forms of a lexeme; a morphosyntax thoroughly deployed in distinguishing topic and contrastive focus; great morphophonological complexity in its verbal derivation and inflection. Of historical interest is the language's preservation of at least a dozen verbs of the archaic "Prefix Conjugation", often attributed to Proto-Afroasiatic itself.

Notes

Further reading
 Hayward, Dick. 1984. The Arbore Language: A First Investigation (including a vocabulary). Hamburg: Helmut Buske Verlag.
 Sasse, Hans-Jürgen. 1974. Kuschitistik 1972. in: Voigt, W (ed.) XIII. Deutscher Orientalistentag - Vorträge, pp. 318-328. Wiesbaden: Steiner.

External links
World Atlas of Language Structures information on Arbore

Languages of Ethiopia
Western Omo–Tana languages